The Aircraft Warning Service (AWS) was a civilian service of the United States Army Ground Observer Corps instated during World War II to keep watch for enemy planes entering American airspace. It became inactive on May 29, 1944.

Purpose
During World War I, the airplane was not generally used as a long-range fighting machine. However, during the period from 1919 to the start of World War II, the heavy bomber was created, capable of ranging far from its home base and carrying a lethal load of high explosives. It soon became clear that a warning system was needed to protect against this new threat. Technology at the outset of World War II consisted of mechanical sound detectors that were found to be inadequate to the job. It was also argued that while soldier lookouts would be valuable, their use would detract from other needed military operations.

Creation
The answer was found in calling on civilian volunteers to act as airplane spotters. With the help of the American Legion, volunteers were organized in May 1941 into the Aircraft Warning Service, the civilian arm of the Army's Ground Observer Corps. On the east coast, the AWS was under the auspices of the Army Air Force's 1st Interceptor Command (later First Fighter Command or I Fighter Command) based at Mitchel Field, New York. On the west coast, the AWS was under the auspices of the 4th Interceptor Command (later Fourth Fighter Command or IV Fighter Command) based in Riverside, California. On both coasts, observation posts, information centers and filter centers were established. The United States entered World War II on Dec 7, 1941. Many of those who could not join the military for whatever reason were recruited to the AWS. Statistically, this led to a preponderance of women, apparent in the surviving material, but seemingly little recognized.

Training
All observers received extensive training in aircraft recognition. This training was so successful that it spilled over into the non-AWS population. Aircraft recognition became a significant hobby providing many with thousands of hours of entertainment and spawning many books and publications, including flashcards, on the subject. Many participated in contests and recognition "Bees". Recognition clubs and meeting flourished becoming a major social phenomenon of the day. Of significant note to the training effort was the use of black, hard rubber, spotter models for various aircraft. Today, often mistaken for poor quality toys, these models can be worth hundreds of dollars and need to be preserved as part of AWS history.

As the war escalated, thousands of observation posts were established on the east coast from the top of Maine to the tip of Florida, and roughly inland as far as the western slopes of the Appalachian Mountains. On the west coast, posts ranged from upper Washington to lower California. Each post had its own code name and number. When aircraft were spotted, the volunteers would record their observations on forms or in log books and then quickly place a call to a regional Army Filter Center and verbally deliver a "Flash Message" which contained the organized data from the observation. In California these messages were a succinct series of brief phrases describing the number of planes, estimated altitude, heading direction, and number of engines: e.g., "one, high, south east, four" <personal observation>. One can imagine that aircraft approaching the coast would be spotted by multiple posts, resulting in multiple Flash Messages and, therefore, a reasonably accurate triangulation of position, speed, direction, altitude, etc.

The training and intense watching bore dramatic fruit in the autumn of 1943 when observers at a post in West Palm Beach, Florida, saw and reported instantly the passage of a German aircraft bearing American markings over their post. The fact that the plane was one that had been captured in Europe and was being flown back to the United States for examination detracted not one bit from the effectiveness of the recognition instruction.

At the peak of operation, the Aircraft Warning Service of the First Fighter Command numbered some 750,000 individuals, of whom about 12,000 were in information and filter centers. Practice interceptions, run almost daily provided significant experience to ground officers and pilots working under simulated combat conditions. Because of its huge scope of operations on the East Coast it was able to save the lives of many young pilots by bringing speedy aid to those whose planes had crashed.

A detailed account of life in an east coast observation post is offered by author Meade Minnigerode in his book, Essex Post, of which only 175 copies were published in 1944 by the Yale University Press.

Information and Filter Centers
To process the data from the observation posts, Information and Filter Centers were established in strategic, but secret, locations on both coasts. The Army called on Mrs. Adelaide Rickenbacker, wife of Capt. Eddie Rickenbacker of World War I fame to assist in recruiting for the centers. The bulk of the center personnel were women drawn from the ranks of housewives, office workers, actresses, entertainers, and executives. In the summer of 1943, the center volunteers were given a name – Aircraft Warning Corps (AWC).

Center personnel represented the information from the flash messages designations on markers placed on large regional plotting maps in windowless rooms. From balconies overlooking these maps, officers of the Army, including the Army Air Force, and Navy watched the flights moving across the boards. To plot these flights, to staff the battery of telephones and to transmit information from filter rooms to operation rooms and from one filter center to another volunteers worked 24 hours a day.

Merit awards
In the summer of 1943, a system of awards for services performed and outstanding accomplishments was established. There were elaborate awards ceremonies for those who "earned their wings" and Merit Awards for those who contributed thousands of hours. In addition to wings and merit awards, there were numerous printed certificates of award and appreciation. Normal insignia included arm bands for Observers and Chief Observers and the rare AWC patch for filter center workers.

Media
On the east coast, to coordinate the interest of the volunteers and to provide a medium for important news and training information, the "Observation Post," a semi-monthly publication of the Ground Observer Corps, was started in March 1942. This four page black and white newsletter gave way to a full-fledged monthly magazine, "Aircraft Warning Volunteer" in June 1943. The original editor was Capt. Frederick W. Pederson. The last publication was a commemorative issue in June 1944. On the west coast, The National Broadcasting Company hosted a famous 30 minute weekly radio broadcast, "Eyes, Aloft!" that provided similar AWS information over the air from August 17, 1942, to November 10, 1943, some 61 episodes. A principal actor was Henry Fonda.

Disbandment
On March 31, 1944, the IV Fighter Command was disbanded. On May 16, 1944, Henry L. Stimson, Secretary of War, wrote in a letter announcing the coming inactivation of the GOC, AWC and AWS, "This does not mean that the War Department is of the opinion that all danger of enemy bombing has passed. On the contrary, a small-scale sneak raid is still within the capabilities of our enemies. We must win this war in Europe and Asia, however, and the calculated risk we are assuming in reducing our air defense measures is justified by the offensive power we will thereby release." With no fighters to scramble, no observers were necessary so inactivation was announced on May 29, 1944. On June 6, 1944, the allies invaded Europe.

On May 27, 1944, Col. Stewart W. Towle, Jr. Commander of the Air Corps, wrote, "I want to express my personal appreciation and that of all the officers and men of this command to the volunteers who have served so loyally and efficiently with us in defense of the eastern seaboard. ... Your country, the Army Air Force, and your fellow Americans owe a debt of gratitude to the members of the Aircraft Warning Service." One observation post survives, in Hebron, Connecticut.

See also
K-class blimp

References

External links 
 Wartime Civil Defense at A History of Central Florida Podcast

 
Ground-based air defence observation corps
Branches of the United States Army